La Palma del Condado is a town and municipality located in the province of Huelva, Spain. According to the 2005 census, it has a population of 9,925 inhabitants. Circuito Monteblanco (Monteblanco race circuit) is situated here, hosting motorsport and corporate events.

Notable people
 Alejandro Alfaro, footballer

References

External links
La Palma del Condado - Sistema de Información Multiterritorial de Andalucía

Municipalities in the Province of Huelva